Pseudorrhinactia is a genus of tachinid flies in the family Tachinidae.

Species
Pseudorrhinactia rubricornis Thompson, 1968

Distribution
Trinidad and Tobago.

References

Exoristinae
Diptera of South America
Tachinidae genera
Monotypic Brachycera genera